La casa del farol rojo ("The House of the Red Lantern") is a 1971 Mexican film. It stars Sara García.

External links
 

1971 films
Mexican drama films
1970s Spanish-language films
1970s Mexican films